Toda Mujer is a 1999 Venezuelan telenovela produced by Venevisión. An original story written by Pilar Romero, it stars Gabriela Vergara and Víctor Cámara as the main protagonists with Jean Carlo Simancas and Mimi Lazo acting as the main antagonists.

Plot
Everything in Manuela Mendoza's life seems to be in perfect order. She is about to marry Ricardo Tariffi, an architect from a wealthy family. But when everything seems to be going well, Manuela will receive a very painful surprise. For the past 15 years, Ricardo has been living a double life. When he was 18, he had an affair with an older woman named Celia and they had a daughter Elizabeth who is now 14 years old. Ricardo doesn't have feelings for Celia, but he has never abandoned her because he was afraid of hurting his daughter. Ricardo has managed to hide his secret family from everyone, especially from his own conservative family who wouldn't understand why his relationship with a woman from a lower class.

Manuela discovers Ricardo's secret and is torn between living an unhappy life by leaving him or forgiveness. She chooses to forgive him. Now, she has to cope with having a teenage step-daughter while also facing the wrath of Celia who is still in love with Ricardo and does everything she can to make Manuela's life miserable. Manuela will try to focus her affection towards Elizabeth while trying to cope with her own repressed feelings about her own mother, a cold and selfish woman who never loved her and left her to be raised by her aunt and uncle.

Cast

References

External links

Toda Mujer / Venevisión 1999 at 

1999 telenovelas
Venevisión telenovelas
1999 Venezuelan television series debuts
2000 Venezuelan television series endings
Venezuelan telenovelas
Spanish-language telenovelas
Television shows set in Caracas